Bailey Flats (also, Baley Flats and Mist) is a former settlement in Madera County, California.

The Mist post office operated from 1913 to 1935.

References

Former settlements in Madera County, California
Former populated places in California